Fura or doonu is a type of food originating from West Africa’s Sahel region and that is popular among the Zarma-Songhai, Fulani and Hausa peoples of the Sahel. It is a millet dough ball, with "fura" meaning millet ball. It is also eaten in Niger and Ghana.<ref>{{Cite journal |last=Philips |first=John Edward |date=April 2008 |title=Mary Wren Bivins. Telling Stories, Making Histories: Women, Words, and Islam in Nineteenth-Century Hausaland and the Sokoto Caliphate (Social History of Africa.)</i> |url=http://dx.doi.org/10.1086/ahr.113.2.620 |journal=The American Historical Review |volume=113 |issue=2 |pages=620 |doi=10.1086/ahr.113.2.620 |issn=0002-8762}}</ref> Certainly, the making of the classic dish, fura da nono (seasoned, boiled millet balls served with sour milk), represents such a blending of food resources and styles of cuisine. This suggests that a transfer of the cuisine of fura served with sour ... The millet is grounded into a powdered form, rolled and molded into balls, then mashed and mixed with Nono'' - a fermented milk. The combination of fura and nono is known as Fura Da Nono, a locally-made drink that contains carbohydrate and fiber. The fura food and the fura da nono drink are popular in Northern Nigeria. They are served during special occasions and as a meal in the afternoons.

Preparation

Ingredients 

 Ground millet or Guinea corn
 Ground peppers
 Dried ground chili
 Dried ground ginger
 Ground cloves
 Salt to taste
 Sugar

Steps 
The millet is first washed, then the peels are removed. It is dried and ground. Dried ginger, cloves, and chili pepper are ground together and added to the powdered millet. Salt is added to the mixture before it is poured into a mortar and pounded while water is sprinkled gradually to form a dough. This is then molded into the desired shapes. The dough can also be poured into a bowl and covered with a leaf overnight for it to ferment. The balls are cooked in a pot, then pounded, and sprinkled with water again. The dough is pounded until it becomes very soft. The paste can then be shaped into balls. It is be dusted with millet or corn flour to prevent the fura from sticking together.

Commercialization in Nigeria 
Fura popularly known in Nigeria as Fura de nunu which was once seen as a local meal has gradually evolved into a growing enterprise that involves modernized processing methods and production.

References

Further reading

External links 
 Video: Making Fura at Home

Nigerian cuisine
Nigerien cuisine
Ghanaian cuisine